Alloiomma is an extinct genus of ants that once belonged to the subfamily Dolichoderinae. A. changweiensis was the first extinct species to be discovered by Zhang in 1989, and another fossil species was discovered in 1994, known as A.differentialis. The ants were endemic to China.

Species
Alloiomma changweiensis Zhang, 1989
Alloiomma differentialis Zhang, Sun & Zhang, 1994

References

†
Fossil taxa described in 1989
†
Fossil ant genera